Valentini may refer to:

Places
 Palazzo Valentini, a palazzo in Rome, Italy
 Ca'Valentini, a subdivision of the Casalgrande commune in Emilia-Romagna, Italy

People
 Valentini (ancient people), an ancient people of Sardinia
 Valentini (surname), a surname and, less commonly, a given name
 Valentini, an aristocratic family, at one time owners of Canossa Castle
 Valentino (surname), pluralized as Valentini
 Valentino Urbani (1690–1722), Italian alto castrato singer, known as "Valentini"

See also

 Bianchi's warbler (Seicercus valentini), species of Old World warbler in the family Sylviidae
 Davidson/Valentini Award, a Gay & Lesbian Alliance Against Defamation award named after Michael Valentini, a GLAAD supporter
 Valentinni's sharpnose puffer (Canthigaster valentini), pufferfish of the genus Canthigaster
 
 Valentin (disambiguation) 
 Valentina (disambiguation) 
 Valentine (disambiguation) 
 Valentino (disambiguation)
 Valentinus (disambiguation)